Quik Is The Name is the debut studio album by American hip hop artist and producer DJ Quik, released by Profile Records on January 15, 1991. Production was mainly handled by DJ Quik along with his executive producers Courtney Branch and Tracy Kendrick. Recording sessions took place throughout 1990 at Westlake Recording Studios in Los Angeles, California, with a production budget of $30,000.

The album debuted and peaked at #29 on the US Billboard 200 chart, selling over 50,000 copies in its first week in America. The album was certified Gold 4 months after its release on May 30, 1991 and Platinum 4 years later on July 26, 1995. , the album has sold over 1,068,203 copies in United States.

Background
DJ Quik was signed by Profile Records in the summer of 1990, after they heard his 1987 mixtape "The Red Tape". He was the most expensive signee that Profile had ever acquired and was also the first artist to have got a six figure deal on the label. Quik revealed to Vibe (magazine) that "Quik Is The Name was originally supposed to be a mixtape that I was going to sell in the ‘hood. I recorded it on a Tascam four-track. I did all the over-dubs, all the blending, and mixed it down on one of those Maxell metal tapes they used to sell. But along comes Dave from Profile Records looking for me like, ‘Hey dude, I heard your cassette, man. Come sign with us.’ [laughs] There was a bidding war between Fred Munao at Select Records and Cory Robbins and Profile. Cory ultimately ended up beating Fred out and I signed with Profile."

Recording

In an interview Quik revealed, that Profile Records gave him a $30,000 budget to mix the record over. He said: "If you do the math: a $1000 a-day studio…if we get Quik is the Name done in less than a month, that’s more money in my pocket. So we got it done in 17 days. We dumped everything out of the SP-1200, brought the turntables into the studio, scratched all the hooks, did all the overdubs and brought in a bass guitar player to fatten up the sound because we would lose a lot of the bass from sampling. We recorded some of the album at Westlake Recording Studios in Santa Monica, which is where Michael Jackson did Thriller. It was a trip being in there mixing "Tonite" on those big boards knowing that Michael was coming in and out of there". The "Tonite" synth was programmed by LA Dream Team's former member and producer, The Real Richie Rich.

Singles
The album's lead single, "Born and Raised in Compton", was released on December 4, 1990. It peaked at number 16 on the Billboard Hot R&B/Hip-Hop Songs and spent 14 weeks on the chart. The album's second single, "Tonite" was released on June 10, 1991. It peaked at number 49 on the US Billboard Hot 100 and number 3 on the US Rap Songs chart. The song became his most successful and highest charting single to date. The album's third and final single, "Quik Is The Name", was released on November 11, 1991. The single did not manage to chart.

Critical response 

Alex Henning of Rhapsody wrote that "Quik's debut set the groundwork for the G-funk era, largely due to the success of "Tonite." Much like Warren G, Quik focuses less on violence and more on mind-altering substances, ladies and cold chillin'. The optimistic "Born and Raised in Compton" offers a remedy to the hard life in the ghetto. Alex Henderson of Allmusic rated the album with 4/5 stars and wrote "in 1991 begged the question: does rap really need yet another gangsta rapper? Indeed, by that time, rap had become saturated with numerous soundalike gangsta rappers -- most of whom weren't even a fraction as interesting as such pioneers of the style as Ice-T, N.W.A, and Schoolly D. Nonetheless, rapper/producer Quik turned out to be more noteworthy than most of the gangsta rappers who debuted that year. Lyrically, the former gang member (who grew up in the same L.A. ghetto as N.W.A, Compton) doesn't provide any major insights. His sex/malt liquor/gang-banging imagery was hardly groundbreaking in 1991. But his hooks, beats, and grooves (many of which owe a debt to 1970s soul and funk) are likeable enough.
Kendrick Lamar named it as his favorite album of all time.

Accolades 
Quik Is The Name appeared on several critics' top albums lists. In 1998, the album was listed on The Source's list of the 100 greatest Rap albums of all time list. The album was listed at number 28 of "The 50 Greatest Debut Albums in Hip-Hop History" by Complex. In 2022, Rolling Stone included the album in their list of The 200 Greatest Hip-Hop Albums of All Time at 156.

Track listing 

 signifies an additional producer.

Personnel
Credits for Quik Is the Name adapted from Allmusic.

 2nd II None - vocals
 AMG - vocals
 Courtney Branch - engineer, executive producer, mixing, producer
 Hi-C - vocals
 Greg Jessie - executive producer
 The Real Richie Rich - engineer, synth programmer
 Stan Jones - bass, guitar

 Tracy Kendrick - engineer, executive producer, mixing, producer
 DJ Quik - keyboards, mixing, producer
 Joe Shay - engineer
 Liz Sroka - engineer
 Howie Weinberg - mastering

Charts

Weekly charts

Year-end charts

Certifications

References 

1991 debut albums
DJ Quik albums
Albums produced by Courtney Branch
Albums produced by DJ Quik
Profile Records albums
Hip hop albums by American artists